The FIRE (for "Fully Integrated Robotised Engine") is a series of automobile engines from Fiat Powertrain Technologies, built in FCA's Termoli, Betim and also in Dundee, MI (only in 1.4 Multiair versions) plants. It was designed by Italian design firm Rodolfo Bonetto. It is constructed by robot assembly plants ("Robogate") to reduce costs.

The FIRE series replaced the old Fiat 100 series Overhead valve engines in the mid-1980s. Mechanically, they are simple inline-four engines with five main bearings crankshaft and overhead cam heads.

Since 1985, it has been constructed in different versions. In addition to the 8 valve versions, there are "Super-FIRE"  16 valve versions.

The  variation introduced in 2003 is available in both 8 and 16 valves. In 2005 Fiat introduced a version of the 16v incorporating port deactivation (PDA) and EGR. This unit is frequently referred to as the "StarJet" engine. One year later, a turbocharged variety of the StarJet was introduced under the name "T-Jet", and a MultiAir (adding electro-hydraulic intake valve driving, with variable timing, lift and profile) version was added in 2009, available in either naturally aspirated and turbocharged forms. It reached 190 PS on the Abarth 695 Biposto.

The FIRE was originally a carburetor engine, and later progressed to single-point injection (SPI), then to multi-point fuel injection (MPI), using sequential multi-port fuel injection (SMPI) today. It is now used in the 750 Formula in a slightly modified state.

Brazilian production started in 2000 with the "Super-FIRE" 1.2 16V (80 PS), was extended until 2006 with 1.0 8V (54 PS), 1.0 16V (69 PS), 1.2 8V (66 PS) and 1.4 8V (80 PS). By 2016, the two "last Super-FIRE" being produced in Brazil were the reworked (New pistons and crankshaft) 1.0 8V (77 PS) and the 1.4 8V VVT (90 PS), both running on petrol or ethanol fuels.

Starting in 2016, it is being replaced by the GSE (FireFly) engine family.

List of FIRE engines
The FIRE engine has been available in the following displacements:

  -  bore x stroke
 SOHC 8V  (1986 - 1992)
  -  bore x stroke
 8V  (1986 - 1993)
 8V SPI  (1987 - 2003)
 DOHC 16V SMPI  (1998 - 2003, Brazil only)
 8V SMPI Flex-fuel  (2005 - current, Brazil only)
  -  bore x stroke
 8V  (1983 - 1993)
 8V SPI  (1993 - 2000)
 8V SMPI  (2001 - 2010)
  -  bore x stroke
 8V SPI  (1993 - 1999)
 8V MPI  (1993 - 1999)
 8V SMPI  (1993 - 2009)
 8V SMPI VVT  (2007 - 2020)
 16V SMPI  (1998 - 2009)
  SMPI -  bore x stroke
 8V SMPI  (2003 - current)
 8V SMPI VVT  (2005 - current)
 8V SMPI Flex-fuel  (2005 - current, Brazil only)
 16V SMPI  (2005 - current)
 16V SMPI StarJet VVT – PDA  (2005 - current)
 16V T-Jet  (2006 - current)
 16V MultiAir  (2009 - current)
 16V MultiAir Turbo  (2009 - current)

Applications

 Autobianchi Y10 (1985)  — 54 PS (40kW)
 Fiat Uno (1986) 
 Fiat Panda (1986) 
 Fiat Tipo (1988) 
 Fiat Punto (1993) 
 Fiat Cinquecento (1994)  — 54 PS (40kW)
 Fiat Bravo/Brava (1995) 
 Lancia Y (1996) 
 Fiat Palio (1997) 
 Fiat Seicento (1998)  — 54 PS (40kW)
 Fiat Punto (1999)  — 
 Fiat Stilo (2001) 
 Fiat Panda (2003)  — 
 Fiat Idea (2003)  — 
 Lancia Ypsilon (2003)  — 
 Lancia Musa (2004)  — 
 Fiat Grande Punto (2005)/Punto Evo (2009)/Punto (2012)  — 
 Fiat Bravo (2007) 
 Fiat 500 (2007)  — 
 Lancia Delta (2008) 
 Alfa Romeo MiTo (2008)  — 
 Ford Ka (2008)  — 
 Tata Indica Vista (2008) 
 Fiat Linea (2009) 1.368 — 
 Tata Indigo Manza (2009) 
 Alfa Romeo Giulietta (2010) 
 Fiat Panda (2011)  — 
 Fiat 500L (2012) 
 Dodge Dart (PF) (2013–2016) 
 Jeep Renegade (2015–present) 
 Jeep Compass (2018-present) 
 Fiat 500X (2015) 
 Fiat Tipo (2015) 
 Fiat 124 Spider (2017–)  MultiAir
 Tatuus FA010

Production
As part of the June 10, 2009 Operating Agreement, Chrysler's commercial production of Fully Integrated Robotized Engine began in its Dundee, Michigan facility. Chrysler's first FIRE engine model, a  1.4-liter FIRE with Multiair engine, was first introduced in Fiat 500 starting in 2010.

See also
 MultiAir
 Fiat Global Small Engine
 JTD engine
 List of engines used in Chrysler products

References

External links

Cinquecento Power Unit info
ClubCento
The Fiat 1.4 Liter FIRE Engine and MultiAir System

Fiat engines
Straight-four engines
Gasoline engines by model